Roberto Valturio (1405–1475) was an Italian engineer and writer born in Rimini. He was the author of the military treatise De Re militari (1472).
The work consists of a preface, with a dedication to Sigismondo Pandolfo Malatesta; a list of the classical works mentioned and an introduction on the history of warfare. The work was widely known: the French King Louis XI of France, the Hungarian king Matthias Corvinus, the Duke of Urbino Federico da Montefeltro and the ruler of Florence Lorenzo de' Medici had a copy of the printed book. In Leonardo da Vinci's list of books Roberto Valturio has been mentioned. This indicates that Leonardo had been in the possession of Roberto's work.

Notes

References
 Pia F. Cuneo Artful Armies, Beautiful Battles: Art and Warfare in Early Modern Europe BRILL, 2002

External links

Roberto Valturio. De Re Militari. Italy, third quarter of the 15th century [182+] 1., the last blank. illus. 34 cm. From the Rare Book and Special Collections Division at the Library of Congress
Roberto Valturio. De Re Militari. [North Italy, third quarter of the 15th century] [208] 1., the last 2 blank. illus. 30 cm. From the Rare Book and Special Collections Division at the Library of Congress

1405 births
1475 deaths
People from Rimini
Medieval military writers